Unifi, UniFi or UNIFI may refer to:

 Unifi (internet service provider), a high speed broadband service in Malaysia
 UNIFI (trade union), the British trade union that merged into Amicus in 2004
 University of Florence
 UNIFI Companies, the former name of Ameritas, a mutual insurance company
 Unifi Network, a former division of PricewaterhouseCoopers made up of the Kwasha Lipton Group and its other benefits consulting divisions
 UniFi, a wireless networking system from Ubiquiti Networks